William Walter Thomas (April 28, 1884 – June 6, 1950) was a professional baseball player. He played part of one season in Major League Baseball for the Boston Doves from 1908. He appeared in five games, all as a shortstop.

External links

Major League Baseball shortstops
Boston Doves players
Lansing Senators players
Keokuk Indians players
Lawrence Colts players
Johnstown Johnnies players
New Bedford Whalers (baseball) players
York White Roses players
Lynn Shoemakers players
Harrisburg Senators players
Larned Wheat Kings players
Ottumwa Packers players
Baseball players from Pennsylvania
1884 births
1950 deaths